Kaadu or The Jungle is a 1952 Indian-American aventure film directed by William Berke. Mr. T. R. Sundaram (The Modern Theatres Ltd) & William Berke Production. It stars Rod Cameron, Cesar Romero, Marie Windsor and M.N. Nambiar in lead roles. The film was the first science fiction film in India. Kaadu was released on 1 August 1952.

Plot
A great white hunter and an Indian princess trek into the Indian jungle to investigate a number of wild animal stampedes which have resulted in the deaths of many people. On their journey, they discover a herd of prehistoric woolly mammoths are responsible for the terror.

Cast
Rod Cameron as Steve Bentley
Cesar Romero as Rama Singh
Marie Windsor as Princess Mari
Sulochana as Aunt Sumira
M. N. Nambiar as Mahaji
David Abraham as Prime Minister
Ramakrishna as Babu
Chitra Devi as Dancer

Critical reception
Writing in Allmovie, author and critic Hal Erickson described the film as "lots of lovely scenery and fascinating glimpses of Indian wildlife, but not much in the way of plot".

See also
Science fiction films in India

References

External links 
 

1950s multilingual films
1950s science fiction adventure films
1950s Tamil-language films
Films scored by G. Ramanathan
1952 films
American black-and-white films
American multilingual films
American science fiction adventure films
Films set in India
Indian black-and-white films
Indian multilingual films
Indian science fiction films
Films about Indian Americans
Lippert Pictures films
1950s American films